Alfredo Azancot (born 1 February 1872, dead 1937) was a Portuguese architect, born on São Tomé Island and educated at the École des ponts ParisTech. He emigrated to Chile, and designed many buildings in Viña del Mar, including Brunet Castle, Rioja Palace and the Carrasco Palace. He also designed the Arco Británico in Valparaíso.

Gallery

References

1872 births
École des Ponts ParisTech alumni
Portuguese architects
Portuguese emigrants to Chile
Year of death missing
People from São Tomé